Lake District Hospital is a hospital in Lakeview, Oregon, United States. In addition to the acute care hospital, the district includes an attached 47-bed unit for skilled long-term care, a home health and hospice service, and outpatient services.

Obstetrical services, surgery, emergency department and related services such laboratory work and x-rays are available. An elected board of governors manages the district, created in 1967. The hospital opened in 1971.

References

External links
 U.S. News Hospital Directory

Hospitals in Oregon
Hospitals established in 1971
Buildings and structures in Lakeview, Oregon
1971 establishments in Oregon
Hospital buildings completed in 1971